Peter Handoyo (born 12 August 1979) is an Indonesian former professional tennis player.

A Surabaya-born player, Handoyo trained in Hilton Head, South Carolina and attained high rankings in junior tennis. He was the 1997 USTA Junior Grass Court singles champion and a finalist at the 1997 Eddie Herr International Championships.

Handoyo played college tennis for the University of Tennessee, where he was a three-time All-American. The ITA Rookie of the Year in 1999, he amassed 145 career singles wins and won the 2002 SEC Indoor Championships. By also claiming an SEC doubles championship in 2002 he became the first player in the open era to win both in the same season.

Between 2001 and 2003 he was a member of Indonesia's Davis Cup team, winning four singles and two doubles rubbers. He won two medals, including a gold, for Indonesia at the 2001 Southeast Asian Games in Kuala Lumpur and earned a further bronze medal at the 2002 Asian Games in Busan.

See also
List of Indonesia Davis Cup team representatives

References

External links
 
 
 

1979 births
Living people
Indonesian male tennis players
Tennessee Volunteers men's tennis players
Sportspeople from Surabaya
Competitors at the 2001 Southeast Asian Games
Southeast Asian Games medalists in tennis
Southeast Asian Games gold medalists for Indonesia
Southeast Asian Games bronze medalists for Indonesia
Tennis players at the 2002 Asian Games
Medalists at the 2002 Asian Games
Asian Games medalists in tennis
Asian Games bronze medalists for Indonesia
21st-century Indonesian people
20th-century Indonesian people